Mesnilius is a genus of flies in the family Tachinidae.

Species
 M. portentosa (Mesnil, 1950)

References

Tachinidae